is a town located in Ikoma District, Nara Prefecture, Japan.

As of April 1, 2015, the town has an estimated population of 18,774, and 7,847 households. and a density of 790 persons per km². The total area is 23.90 km².

Education

Elementary schools
 Heguri Elementary School
 Hegurikita Elementary School
 Heguriminami Elementary School

Junior high schools
 Heguri Junior High School

Transportation

Rail 
Kintetsu Railway
Ikoma Line: Motosanjōguchi Station - Heguri Station - Tatsutagawa Station

Road 
Japan National Route 168

Images

See also 
Shigisan Gyokuzōin

References

External links

 Heguri official website 

Towns in Nara Prefecture